Mituliodon is a genus of spiders in the family Miturgidae. It was first described in 2003 by Raven & Stumkat. , it contains only one species, Mituliodon tarantulinus, found in Timor and Australia.

References

Miturgidae
Monotypic Araneomorphae genera
Spiders of Asia
Spiders of Australia